"Good Life" is a song by American electronic music group Inner City, featuring vocals by Paris Grey, and was released in November 1988 as the second single from their debut album, Paradise (1989). It is written and produced by Kevin Saunderson, and became a hit all over the world, reaching number-one in Finland and number four in the UK. In the US, it peaked at number-one on the Billboard Hot Dance Club Play chart. Its music video is directed by Andrew Doucette and filmed in London. "Good Life", along with "Big Fun", has been considered for being prototypes for Belgian act Technotronic's 1989 hit "Pump Up The Jam", and is today widely considered a classic of its genre.

Background and release

Electronic music producer Kevin Saunderson met singer Paris Grey through a good friend of his. She then travelled to Detroit to collaborate with him on their debut single, "Big Fun", which was released in 1988. After its success, Virgin asked for a follow-up single and "Good Life" was chosen right away. It was written using basic instruments including a Casio CZ-5000 synth and a Roland TR-909 drum machine. Saunderson made the instrumental part in his own apartment and rented a studio for 24 hours to record it with Grey. He was very happy with the result.

He told in an interview about making the song, "The vocals were 100% Paris on 'Good Life', I just gave her some direction. I said, 'Look, I don't want it to sound like 'Big Fun' but I want it to be in the same family, I want to follow up with a feel that's similar.'" The original version of the track was almost like a radio version, and Juan Atkins, Derrick May and Steve "Silk" Hurley made remixes for the single. It peaked at number four in the UK in January 1989, and was certified silver by the British Phonographic Industry for sales exceeding 200,000 copies. It's their highest-charting single to date and became huge at rave parties and acid house clubs.

In 1999, it was re-recorded and remixed by producer Tommy Onyx and a Spanish language version was also released. It hit number 10 on the UK Singles Chart and was released by [PIAS] Recordings (whereas the original version was issued by Virgin/AVL's 10 Records label). A new music video was also made to accompany it.

Chart performance
"Good Life" was very successful globally, peaking at number-one in Finland and on both the Canadian RPM Dance/Urban chart and the US Billboard Hot Dance Club Play chart. In Europe, it made it to number two in West Germany, being held off the top spot by Robin Beck's "First Time". It entered the top 10 also in Belgium (7), Ireland (6), the Netherlands (4), Norway (10), Sweden (9), Switzerland (5), and the United Kingdom. In the latter, it peaked at number four in its fifth week at the UK Singles Chart, on January 1, 1989. It spent two weeks at that position. Additionally, "Good Life" was a top 20 hit in Austria (12) and a top 30 hit in Italy (22). In Oceania, it reached number eight in New Zealand and number 52 in Australia. On the US Billboard Hot 100, it peaked at number 73.

Critical reception
Alex Henderson from AllMusic complimented the song as a "house gem". Another editor, John Bush, praised it as a "uplifting" gem from the "uncommonly moody Detroit club scene of the '80s." Upon the release, J.D. Considine from The Baltimore Sun felt that songs like "Good Life" "boast more than enough pop appeal for the average listener." Robert Hilburn from Los Angeles Times wrote, "The emphasis in this hyperactive dance-floor is on inviting sound textures, with all sorts of turntable high jinks adding to the dizzy exuberance." Another editor, Chris Willman, stated, "No record this year will have a better groove (or mixture of grooves, really) than this one from Inner City". He also remarked that the lyrics "yearn plaintively for something better". Pan-European magazine Music & Media said, "If you thought "Big Fun" was good, then check this out. Same basic formula but more melody. Funky and smouldering." Upon the 1998 remix, Music Week wrote, "Guaranteed to cut through the winter cold, this uplifting update of the 1988 house classic adds acoustic guitar flourishes, warm synth washes and Spanish vocals to the original." 

Alf Billingham from The Observer deemed it "another unequivocal slab of techno hi-tech". In an 2017 retrospective review, Pop Rescue stated that the song is "absolutely flawless in production, strength of vocals and beats", noting that "those up-beat lyrics, over a catchy synth and bassline, mixed with Paris Grey's fantastically dreamy vocals really does make this track feel like a slice of sunshine in the winter". Matthew Cole from the RM Dance Update named it Inner City's "finest moment". Barry Walters for The San Francisco Examiner concluded that as evident in club hits like "Good Life", "Grey has a voice to be reckoned with. Exuberant, exultant and yet relaxed, it can lovingly rap itself around notes and emotions other singers strain to reach. And it won't let go." Alex Kadis from Smash Hits praised it as a "smashing dance single", stating that "singing girlie person, Paris Grey, has the perfect voice for house-type records."

Music video
A music video was made for the song, which sees Kevin Saunderson and Paris Grey prancing around in London. It was directed by Andrew Doucette. Several famous landmarks can be seen in the video, like Trafalgar Square, St Paul's Cathedral and Piccadilly Circus. Bystanders on the street were stopped and asked to film them. At one point they saw a Rolls-Royce parked on the kerb with a uniformed chauffeur standing by it. The director asked the driver if they could use the car for a minute. The chauffeur drove Grey down the street and then parked it back exactly where it had been, all before the owner returned. "Good Life" was later published on YouTube in October 2012, and by February 2023, the video had generated more than 8.3 million views.

Impact and legacy
American DJ, record producer, remixer and songwriter Armand van Helden picked "Good Life" as one of his "classic cuts" in 1995, adding, "One of my first vocal house records, before that I was into the Todd Terry, Royal House stuff. When Inner City came out with "Good Life" it struck me – it's a happy song but very powerful. It moves the dancefloor but it's sassy, it wasn't weak. It had house and techno elements years ahead of its time."

Mixmag ranked the song number 20 in its "100 Greatest Dance Singles Of All Time" list in 1996, adding, "As the Summer of Love drew to a close, a tune emerged which distilled the spirit of club hedonism, pressed it onto vinyl and slapped it on the decks of every discerning DJ. "Let me take you to a place I know you wanna go," cooed Paris Grey over a chunky effortlessly uplifting backdrop, "it's the good life". And thousands of kids turned on to this bizarre new way of spending your Saturday night knew exactly what she meant. Remove it from its cultural context, play it eight years after it first came out and you're still left with a beautiful, remarkable house record."

Slant Magazine ranked it 55th in its "100 Greatest Dance Songs" list in 2006, writing, "1988's "Good Life" clanked like techno, pumped like house and featured disco diva vocals from his partner in Inner City, Paris Grey. "Let me take you to a place you know you wanna go/It's a good life," she belts, creating the clearest picture of dance floor halcyon since Chic sang about 54 and its roller skates, roller skates."

In Time Outs 2015 list of "The 20 Best House Tracks Ever", "Good Life" was included at #11, adding, "One of Detroit techno don Kevin Saunderson's housier, poppier moments - under his Inner City project with singer Paris Grey - also became his most well-known. With its unashamedly upbeat vocals and colourful '80s synths all over the place, 'Good Life' showed that dance music wasn't all about heads-down raving in a dark basement club - it could also be (whisper it) happy, for no damn reason at all."

Mixmag included the song in their ranking of "The Best 20 House Classics From Before 1990" in 2017.

Accolades

(*) indicates the list is unordered.

Track listings

 7" single, Italy (1988)"Good Life" (Master Reese Edit) — 3:59
"Good Life" (Instrumental) — 5:12
"Good Life" (Original 12" Mix) - 7:13

 12" single, UK (1988)"Good Life" (Magic Juan's Mix) — 8:18
"Good Life" (Mayday Club Mix) — 6:12
"Big Fun" (L.A. Big Big Fun Remix) — 5:12

 12" single, US (1988)"Good Life" (Mayday Mix) — 6:12
"Good Life" (Steve "Silk" Hurley Mix) — 7:11
"Good Life" (Radio Mix) — 3:59
"Good Life" (Magic Juan Mix) — 8:28
"Good Life" (Mike "Hitman" Wilson Mix) — 7:21
"Big Fun" (Les Adams Remix) — 6:47

 CD single, UK & Europe (1989)'''
"Good Life" (Master Reese Edit 7") — 4:05
"Good Life" (Magic Juan's Mix 12") — 8:29
"Big Fun" (L.A. Big Big Fun Remix) — 5:15

Charts

Weekly charts

1998 Tommy Onyx version

Year-end charts

Sampling
In 1984 samples Volume of the Good Life GMBH a Frankfurt Germany sound recording Pop dance single classic produced by D.Staggs Sr
In 1989 it was sampled in "(Still Life) Keeps Moving" by Nexus 21, and in "Techno Time" by The Maxx.
In 1990 "A Place Called Bliss" by Cyclone (2) used a sample.
In 1992 it got sampled by Yuzo Koshiro in the song "Go Straight", and by Jungle House Crew in "Let Me Take You".
In 1996 it was sampled in "Chord Memory" by Ian Pooley.
In 2005 "Rock On" by Jackson and His Computer Band used a sample of "Good Life".
In 2008 it got sampled by Hercules and Love Affair in the song "You Belong", and in "Be Free" by Promise Land.
In 2009 Rihanna used a sample in the song "Bubble Pop", and it was also used in "Celebration" by Tony Lionni and by Kim Fai in the song "Good Life".
In 2013 it was sampled in "Wanna Go" by Maxsta feat. Little Nikki, and "Cut Me Up" by Stanton Warriors and Them & Us.
In 2014 it got sampled in "Let Me" by René Amesz.
In 2015 "Techno Disco" by Kerrier District and "Wanna Go" by Dos Padres used a sample.
 In 2021 Ferry Corsten sampled parts of the vocals for his song "Lemme Take You".

In popular culture
In November 1996, the song was featured prominently in the opening scene of "Smack is Back", a third-season episode of the FOX police drama television series New York Undercover.
It was featured in the opening credits of House of Style when it premiered on MTV in January 1989.
It was also featured in the films Slaves of New York (1989), Side Out (1990) and B*A*P*S (1997).
It was programmed as a chiptune for the Game Boy Advance e-reader.
German DJ/remixer Gardeweg used portions of this song, along with Inner City's other two singles, "Big Fun" and "Paradise", for his 2003 single "All I Want"
In 2005 the song was used in the South African movie Crazy Monkey presents Straight Outta Benoni. Both the original Inner City version and a cover by South African band The Finkelsteins were used in the soundtrack.
Hercules and Love Affair sampled the synth on the song You Belong from their 2008 self-titled album.
It was featured in the closing credits of the 2012 Tour de France coverage on Eurosport.
Gossip sampled the synth on the song "Get Lost" from their 2012 album A Joyful Noise.
Britney Spears sampled many elements of the song on the track "Up n' Down" from her 2011 album Femme Fatale''.
M-22 samples the song in their 2019 single "White Lies"

References

1988 songs
1988 singles
1999 singles
Inner City (band) songs
Number-one singles in Finland
UK Independent Singles Chart number-one singles
Songs written by Kevin Saunderson
Songs written by Paris Grey